Bruce Medd (born 30 June 1953) is a Canadian gymnast. He competed in four events at the 1972 Summer Olympics.

References

1953 births
Living people
Canadian male artistic gymnasts
Olympic gymnasts of Canada
Gymnasts at the 1972 Summer Olympics
Sportspeople from Ottawa